is an action video game for the PlayStation 3 and PlayStation 4 developed by CyberConnect2 and published by Bandai Namco Entertainment. Based on the Jo Jo's Bizarre Adventure manga series by Hirohiko Araki, Eyes of Heaven is the second game in the franchise to be developed by CyberConnect2, following 2013's JoJo's Bizarre Adventure: All Star Battle, with which this game shares the same engine. The game was released for the PlayStation 3 and PlayStation 4 in Japan on December 17, 2015 and was released exclusively on the PlayStation 4 in Western territories on June 28, 2016.

Plot
The game's main storyline takes place immediately following the events of Stardust Crusaders. Jotaro Kujo and his allies, having just defeated the evil vampire Dio Brando, are suddenly attacked by friends and enemies who have either disappeared or died along the way. They are soon approached by a young Robert E. O. Speedwagon, who possesses a piece of the Saint's Corpse that allows him to not only travel through time and space, but also dispel the evil influence possessing the mysterious foes. Speedwagon leads Jotaro and his allies on a journey through space, time, and alternate universes, in order to stop another iteration of Dio and his disciple Enrico Pucci from obtaining the Saint's Corpse and purging the world of the Joestar family. In their quest to collect the Saint's Corpse, Jotaro and Joseph are joined by characters from each part of JoJo's Bizarre Adventure, including Jotaro's great-great grandfather Jonathan Joestar, a younger version of Joseph Joestar, Joseph's and Dio's illegitimate sons Josuke Higashikata and Giorno Giovanna, Jotaro's own daughter Jolyne Cujoh, paraplegic jockey Johnny Joestar, and an amnesiac given the temporary name of Josuke Higashikata.

The heroes collect every part of the Corpse save one. Suddenly, the Joestars encounter an alternate Dio Brando, now wielding an upgraded version of his Stand that can rewrite reality itself, which he calls The World Over Heaven. Though Dio takes most of their collected parts of the Corpse, the group narrowly escapes Dio's grasp, with Jotaro retaining a piece of the Corpse. Funny Valentine appears to the group and reveals that the version of Dio they encountered, now known as DIO, Gone to Heaven, learned of the base world upon encountering him and nullifying the infinite rotation Johnny had placed upon him. Valentine further reveals that this version of Dio still bears the same type of Stand as Jotaro's, and remains unaware that objects from parallel dimensions are drawn to each other and destroyed upon contact. As the Joestars continue battling Dio's minions to regain their stolen Corpse parts, Valentine is eliminated by Dio as retribution for his betrayal.

Eventually, the Joestar group returns to Egypt to confront Dio, who defeats and absorbs most of the group's souls along with the completed Saint's Corpse. Despite a final stand by Jotaro and Jolyne, the former having discovered his own Stand's upgraded ability, Dio eliminates Jolyne and attempts to do the same to Jotaro. However, Jotaro uses Dio's armlets from his own universe to destroy Dio's hands, the source of his Stand's ability to rewrite reality, before ultimately pummeling Dio and completely destroying his body. After Dio's defeat, Jotaro uses Star Platinum's new powers to restore the original timeline and prevent the deaths of the Joestar family's allies. Returning to the same point where he left, Jotaro parts ways with his friends as he and Joseph board a flight to Japan.

Eleven years later, Jotaro arrives in Morioh with a six-year-old Jolyne, hoping to be a better father to her in this timeline. As Jolyne runs off to play with a turtle, Jotaro approaches a youth named Koichi Hirose and asks him about a high schooler named Josuke Higashikata, setting the events of an alternate Diamond Is Unbreakable in motion.

Gameplay 
Eyes of Heaven is designed to be a 3D action brawler with tag-team elements set in large arenas based on locations in the JoJo's Bizarre Adventure manga. Players may pick a single character to control in a large environment, as well as a second character that may be controlled by either a CPU or second human player to fight the enemy team for a 2v2 battle. The playstyle is similar to that of other known CyberConnect2's Shonen Jump game series, Naruto: Ultimate Ninja series, such as the combo mechanisms and the air to air combos. The game allows for online play through the PlayStation Network system.

Battle Styles
Like in All Star Battle characters are categorized by Battle Styles which change how each character plays in the game, as well as their different strengths and weaknesses. For example, Vampires and the Mode-using Pillar Men heal from damage over time, except from Ripple-enhanced attacks; They can also be immobilized by ultraviolet lamps as part of Rudol von Stroheim's "The Prime Example of Superior German Science" style. Also new in Eyes of Heaven is that characters that were previously classified in All Star Battle as having one Battle Style but displayed abilities of another are now classified as having two Battle Styles. For example, Old Joseph Joestar is now classed as both a Ripple User and a Stand User, while in the previous game he was only classified as a Stand User who happened to have Ripple attacks as well.

Characters 

Jojo's Bizarre Adventure: Eyes of Heaven features the return of all playable characters from CyberConnect2's previous series entry, All Star Battle, with the exception of guest character Ikuro Hashizawa. The game also adds 13 new playable characters for a total of 53.

Part 1 Phantom Blood
Jonathan Joestar (voice: Kazuyuki Okitsu), Hamon User
Will A. Zeppeli (voice: Yoku Shioya), Hamon User
Robert E. O. Speedwagon (voice: Yoji Ueda), Ogre Street
Dio Brando (voice: Takehito Koyasu), Vampire
Part 2 Battle Tendency
Joseph Joestar (voice: Tomokazu Sugita), Hamon User
Caesar Anthonio Zeppeli (voice: Takuya Satō), Hamon User
Rudol von Stroheim (voice: Atsushi Imaruoka), The Prime Example of Superior German Science
Wamuu (voice: Akio Ōtsuka), Wind Mode
Esidisi (voice: Keiji Fujiwara), Heat Control Mode
Kars (voice: Kazuhiko Inoue), Light Mode
Lisa Lisa (voice: Atsuko Tanaka), Hamon User
Part 3 Stardust Crusaders
Jotaro Kujo (voice: Daisuke Ono), Stand User; Stand Name: Star Platinum
Noriaki Kakyoin (voice: Daisuke Hirakawa), Stand User; Stand Name: Hierophant Green
Old Joseph Joestar(voice: Unsho Ishizuka) Hamon User and Stand User; Stand Name: Hermit Purple
Jean Pierre Polnareff (voice: Fuminori Komatsu), Stand User; Stand Name: Silver Chariot
Muhammad Avdol (voice: Kenta Miyake), Stand User; Stand Name: Magician's Red
Iggy (voice: Misato Fukuen), Stand User; Stand Name: The Fool
Hol Horse (voice: Hidenobu Kiuchi), Stand User; Stand Name: Emperor
N'Doul (voice: Kentarō Itō), Stand User; Stand Name: Geb
Mariah (voice: Ayahi Takagaki), Stand User; Stand Name: Bastet
Pet Shop Stand User; Stand Name: Horus
Vanilla Ice (voice: Shō Hayami), Vampire and Stand User; Stand Name: Cream
DIO (voice: Takehito Koyasu), Vampire and Stand User; Stand Name: The World
Part 4 Diamond Is Unbreakable
Josuke Higashikata (voice: Wataru Hatano), Stand User; Stand Name: Crazy Diamond
Koichi Hirose (voice: Romi Park), Stand User; Stand Name: Echoes Act 1, 2, and 3
Yukako Yamagishi, (voice: Chinatsu Akasaki), Stand User; Stand Name: Love Deluxe
Okuyasu Nijimura (voice: Wataru Takagi), Stand User; Stand Name: The Hand
Rohan Kishibe (voice: Hiroshi Kamiya), Stand User; Stand Name: Heaven's Door
Shigekiyo Yangu, (voice: Kappei Yamaguchi), Stand User; Stand Name: Harvest
Akira Otoishi (voice: Showtaro Morikubo), Stand User; Stand Name: Red Hot Chili Pepper
Kosaku Kawajiri (voice: Rikiya Koyama), Stand User; Stand Name: Killer Queen (with Bomb No. 3 Bites the Dust and Stray Cat)
Yoshikage Kira (voice: Rikiya Koyama), Stand User; Stand Name: Killer Queen (with Bomb No. 2 Sheer Heart Attack)
, Stand User; Stand Name: Star Platinum The World

Part 5 Golden Wind
Giorno Giovanna (voice: Daisuke Namikawa), Stand User; Stand Name: Gold Experience and Gold Experience Requiem
Guido Mista (voice: Kenji Akabane), Stand User; Stand Name: Sex Pistols
Pannacotta Fugo (voice: Hisafumi Oda), Stand User; Stand Name: Purple Haze
Narancia Ghirga (voice: Yuuko Sanpei), Stand User; Stand Name: Aerosmith
Bruno Bucciarati (voice: Noriaki Sugiyama), Stand User; Stand Name: Sticky Fingers
Trish Una (voice: Nao Toyama), Stand User; Stand Name: Spice Girl
Diavolo (voice: Toshiyuki Morikawa), Stand User; Stand Name: King Crimson
Vinegar Doppio (voice: Akira Ishida)
Part 6 Stone Ocean
Jolyne Cujoh (voice: Miyuki Sawashiro), Stand User; Stand Name: Stone Free
Ermes Costello (voice: Chizu Yonemoto), Stand User; Stand Name: Kiss
Weather Report (voice: Tōru Ōkawa), Stand User; Stand Name: Weather Report
Enrico Pucci (voice: Jouji Nakata), Stand User; Stand Name: Whitesnake, 
Narciso Anasui (voice: Yuichi Nakamura), Stand User; Stand Name: Diver Down
, Stand User; Stand Name: C-Moon and Made In Heaven
Part 7 Steel Ball Run
Johnny Joestar (voice: Yūki Kaji), Mounted Fighter and Stand User; Stand Name: Tusk Acts 1, 2, 3 and 4
Gyro Zeppeli (voice: Shinichiro Miki), Mounted Fighter, Spin User, and Stand User; Stand Name: Ball Breaker
Diego Brando (voice: Takehito Koyasu), Mounted Fighter and Stand User; Stand Name: Scary Monsters
Funny Valentine (voice: Yasuyuki Kase), Stand User; Stand Name: Dirty Deeds Done Dirt Cheap (D4C)
, Mounted and Stand User; Stand Name: THE WORLD
Part 8 JoJolion
Josuke Higashikata (voice: Mitsuaki Madono), Stand User; Stand Name: Soft & Wet
Joshu Higashikata (voice: Hiroaki Miura), Stand User; Stand Name: Nut King Call

Original non-playable character
, Vampire and Stand User; Stand Name: 

Notes

Development 
The game was first announced in the 01, 15, 2015 issue of Fatitsu and featured characters returning from JoJo's Bizarre Adventure: All Star Battle, such as Joseph Joestar, Jotaro Kujo, Noriaki Kakyoin, Caesar Zeppeli, and Josuke Higashikata (from Diamond Is Unbreakable), but also revealed the introduction of new characters Rudol von Stroheim and Diego Brando. Voice actors from All Star Battle as well as the JoJo's Bizarre Adventure: Stardust Crusaders anime adaptation reprise their roles in Eyes of Heaven. A demo of the game was revealed at the 2015 Jump Festa on December 20, 2014, and was made public on the Japanese PlayStation Store on January 29, 2015. On June 20, 2015, a second trailer for Eyes of Heaven was publicly revealed in downtown Shinjuku at the Studio Alta building. The trailer showcased all playable characters revealed so far from Phantom Blood to Diamond Is Unbreakable, as well as adventure and arena stages based on the locations featured in the manga.

The developer's official Twitter revealed on July 18, 2015, that the story mode for Eyes of Heaven would be personally handled by series creator Hirohiko Araki. In addition, it was also promised that the game would receive no paid downloadable content (DLC) or microtransactions beyond release, though they noted the possibility of preorder DLC. On August 21, 2015, a new key visual unveiled for the game revealed the remaining Parts, Stone Ocean and JoJolion alongside the playability of main protagonists Jolyne Cujoh, Johnny Joestar and Josuke Higashikata. On September 11, an issue of Jump magazine revealed the inclusion of the remaining Diamond is Unbreakable characters previously appearing in All-Star Battle, being Rohan Kishibe, Okuyasu Nijimura and Kosaku Kawajiri, as well as the game's upcoming playable appearance at the 2015 Tokyo Game Show. In addition, it was also announced that players who buy the first printing of the game would receive a limited-available code that allows them to play as Jotaro Kujo in his Part 4 incarnation (unavailable for use in either the game's Story Mode or in a Tag Team match paired with his Part 3 counterpart). Lastly, the game's release date of December 17, 2015 was revealed.

The third trailer of Eyes of Heaven was revealed on September 20, 2015, during a special JoJo conference, along with several gameplay demonstrations streamed live. The trailer is once again narrated by Rohan who meets with Tonio Trussardi at the "Cafe Deux Magots", and is later confronted by a shadowy figure once he discovers a fallen "Book of Heaven".

Reception

The game received a 34/40 by Famitsu magazine.

References

External links 

2015 video games
Bandai Namco games
CyberConnect2 games
Eyes Of Heaven
Multiplayer and single-player video games
PlayStation 3 games
PlayStation 4 games
Fighting games
Platform fighters
3D fighting games
Tag team videogames
Video games about time travel
Video games developed in Japan
Video games set in Egypt
Video games set in Italy
Video games set in Japan
Video games set in Rome
Video games set in the United Kingdom
Video games set in the United States
video games set in Venice